Elements and Things may refer to:
"Elements and Things", a song from ...Continued (1969)
"Elements and Things", a song from Lady in Gold (album) (2016)